Giancarlo Bergamini (2 August 1926 – 4 February 2020) was an Italian fencer. He won one gold and two silver medals at two Olympic Games. Bergamini died in February 2020 at the age of 93.

References

External links
 

1926 births
2020 deaths
Italian male fencers
Olympic fencers of Italy
Fencers at the 1952 Summer Olympics
Fencers at the 1956 Summer Olympics
Olympic gold medalists for Italy
Olympic silver medalists for Italy
Fencers from Milan
Olympic medalists in fencing
Medalists at the 1952 Summer Olympics
Medalists at the 1956 Summer Olympics